The U.S.  currently has 36 statistical areas that have been delineated by the Office of Management and Budget (OMB). On March 6, 2020, the OMB delineated seven combined statistical areas, 22 metropolitan statistical areas, and seven micropolitan statistical areas in Florida.


Statistical areas
The Office of Management and Budget (OMB) has designated more than 1,000 statistical areas for the United States and Puerto Rico. These statistical areas are important geographic delineations of population clusters used by the OMB, the United States Census Bureau, planning organizations, and federal, state, and local government entities.

The OMB defines a core-based statistical area (commonly referred to as a CBSA) as "a statistical geographic entity consisting of the county or counties (or county-equivalents) associated with at least one core of at least 10,000 population, plus adjacent counties having a high degree of social and economic integration with the core as measured through commuting ties with the counties containing the core." The OMB further divides core-based statistical areas into metropolitan statistical areas (MSAs) that have "a population of at least 50,000" and micropolitan statistical areas (μSAs) that have "a population of at least 10,000, but less than 50,000."

The OMB defines a combined statistical area (CSA) as "a geographic entity consisting of two or more adjacent core-based statistical areas with employment interchange measures of at least 15%." The primary statistical areas (PSAs) include all combined statistical areas and any core-based statistical area that is not a constituent of a combined statistical area.

Table
The table below describes the 36 United States statistical areas and 67 counties of the State of Florida with the following information:An out-of-state area is displayed in green.
The combined statistical area (CSA) as designated by the OMB.
The CSA population according to 2019 US Census Bureau population estimates.
The core based statistical area (CBSA) as designated by the OMB.
The CBSA population according to 2019 US Census Bureau population estimates 
The county name
The county population according to 2019 US Census Bureau population estimates 
The Metropolitan Division name, if applicable
The Metropolitan Division population according to 2019 US Census Bureau population estimates

See also

Geography of Florida
Demographics of Florida

Notes

References

External links

Office of Management and Budget
United States Census Bureau

United States statistical areas
Statistical Areas Of Florida
Statistical Areas Of Florida
Statistical Areas Of Florida